Thelymitra glaucophylla is a species of orchid that is endemic to South Australia. It has a single erect, channelled, pale green leaf and up to fifteen pale blue, mauve or white flowers with an inflated, greyish lobe on top of the anther.

Description
The lobe on the top of the anther is greyish brown with a yellow tip, an inflated tube shape and gently curved with two lobes on its end. The side lobes have toothbrush-like tufts of white or creamy yellow hairs. Flowering occurs from October to December.

Taxonomy and naming
Thelymitra glaucophylla was first formally described in 2013 by Jeff Jeanes after an unpublished description by Robert Bates. The formal description was published in Muelleria from a specimen collected near Sevenhill. The specific epithet (glaucophylla) is derived from the Ancient Greek meaning "bluish-grey leaf", referring to the large, glaucous leaves of this species.

Distribution and habitat
This sun orchid mostly grows in open forest, woodland and grassland, often in hilly places. It is locally common in the south-east of South Australia.

References

External links 

glaucophylla
Endemic orchids of Australia
Orchids of South Australia
Plants described in 2013